Lucky Night (Italian: Notte di fortuna) is a 1941 Italian "white-telephones" comedy film directed by Raffaello Matarazzo and starring Peppino De Filippo, Leda Gloria and Vera Bergman. It was the first film De Filippo starred in without his more famous brother Eduardo De Filippo.

It was shot at the Titanus Studios in Rome with sets designed by the art director Piero Rosi.

Synopsis
A small town pharmacist's clerk goes to a San Remo casino and wins a major fortune in a single night of gambling. However, urged on by a mysterious woman, he subsequently loses it all.

Cast
 Peppino De Filippo as Biagio Natalini 
 Leda Gloria as La sorella del principale 
 Vera Bergman as La ragazza misteriosa 
 Olinto Cristina
 Gorella Gori
 Nino Marchetti
 Guido Notari
 Fausto Guerzoni
 Giulio Alfieri
 Iginia Armilli
 Gino Baghetti
 Luigi Barbieri
 Ciro Berardi
 Michele Malaspina
 Nicola Maldacea
 Lina Tartara Minora
 Silva Nova
 Giovanni Petrucci
 Cesare Pianigiani
 Domenico Serra
 Edda Soligo
 Olga von Kollar

References

Bibliography 
  Roberto Curti. Riccardo Freda: The Life and Works of a Born Filmmaker. McFarland, 2017.

External links 
 

1941 films
Italian comedy films
Italian black-and-white films
1941 comedy films
1940s Italian-language films
Films directed by Raffaello Matarazzo
1940s Italian films